Waihi Beach is a coastal town at the western end of the Bay of Plenty in New Zealand's North Island. It lies 10 kilometres to the east of the town of Waihi, at the foot of the Coromandel Peninsula. The main beach is 10 kilometres long.

At the northern end of Waihi Beach, the  Orokawa Scenic Reserve offers several short walking tracks along the coast and to Orokawa Bay. While the main beach is backed by the residential area of the township of Waihi Beach, Orokawa Bay is undeveloped and surrounded by native bush including pohutukawa, puriri, and nikau palms.

At the southern end of the beach is the small settlement of Bowentown and the northern side of the northern Katikati entrance to Tauranga Harbour.

History and culture

Early history

Māori have lived in the region since pre-European times, with numerous pā sites within a few kilometres of Waihi Beach. There is still evidence of the old pā sites at the Bowentown end of Waihi Beach.

The name Waihi ("Rising Water") is said to be named after a stream which flows into the beach, the later town of Waihi taking its name from the name for the beach.

Modern history

The Waihi Beach Hotel was built in 1967 and the Athenree mineral hot springs are located nearby. Nearby Waihi is known for the gold and silver mining operation at Martha Mine and several underground mines.

Marae

Otāwhiwhi Marae, located in Bowentown, is a marae (tribal meeting ground) of the Ngāi Te Rangi tribe and Ngāi Tauwhao sub-tribe; it includes the Tamaoho wharenui (meeting house).

In October 2020, the Government committed $500,000 from the Provincial Growth Fund to upgrade the marae. The upgrade is expected to create 33 jobs.

Demographics

Waihi Beach-Bowentown had a population of 2,484 at the 2018 New Zealand census, an increase of 336 people (15.6%) since the 2013 census, and an increase of 426 people (20.7%) since the 2006 census. There were 1,029 households, comprising 1,233 males and 1,251 females, giving a sex ratio of 0.99 males per female. The median age was 54.8 years (compared with 37.4 years nationally), with 336 people (13.5%) aged under 15 years, 303 (12.2%) aged 15 to 29, 1,077 (43.4%) aged 30 to 64, and 765 (30.8%) aged 65 or older.

Ethnicities were 89.9% European/Pākehā, 14.6% Māori, 1.0% Pacific peoples, 2.5% Asian, and 1.4% other ethnicities. People may identify with more than one ethnicity.

The percentage of people born overseas was 13.9, compared with 27.1% nationally.

Although some people chose not to answer the census's question about religious affiliation, 54.1% had no religion, 34.2% were Christian, 1.7% had Māori religious beliefs, 0.7% were Hindu, 0.4% were Buddhist and 1.6% had other religions.

Of those at least 15 years old, 363 (16.9%) people had a bachelor's or higher degree, and 369 (17.2%) people had no formal qualifications. The median income was $28,600, compared with $31,800 nationally. 378 people (17.6%) earned over $70,000 compared to 17.2% nationally. The employment status of those at least 15 was that 837 (39.0%) people were employed full-time, 363 (16.9%) were part-time, and 57 (2.7%) were unemployed.

Education

The school opened in 1924.

References

Western Bay of Plenty District
Populated places in the Bay of Plenty Region
Beaches of the Bay of Plenty Region
Populated places around the Tauranga Harbour